Detrit Sathian Gym (also spelled Dechrid, Dejrit) is a Thai Muay Thai kickboxer from the Khon Kaen province in Thailand. He is the IMC World Super Welterweight 154lbs. Champion.

Detrit is also a former WPMF World 147lbs. Champion and interim WPMF World 160lbs. Champion.

As of November 2020, Detrit is ranked the No. 11 super welterweight by WBC Muaythai.

Titles and accomplishments
 International Muaythai Council 
 2020 IMC World Super Welterweight 154lbs. Champion 

 IKC K9 Championship 
 2019 IKC K9 World Middleweight 159lbs. Champion

 International Professional Combat Council 
 2019 IPCC Asian Champion Combat Council 154lbs. 4-Man Tournament Champion 

 World Professional Muaythai Federation
 2016 Interim WPMF World Middleweight 160lbs. Champion
 2014 WPMF World Welterweight 147lbs. Champion
Siam Omnoi Stadium
 2015 Isuzu Cup Tournament Runner-up

Muay Thai record 

|-  style="background:#CCFFCC;"
| 2022-05-28 || Win ||align=left| Victor Hugo || Muay Hardcore || Bangkok, Thailand || Decision || 3 || 3:00
|-  style="background:#CCFFCC;"
| 2020-12-19 || Win ||align=left| Nicolas Mendes || MAX Muay Thai || Pattaya, Thailand || Decision || 3 || 3:00
|-  style="background:#CCFFCC;"
| 2020-01-17 || Win ||align=left| Wanchalerm Uddonmuang || Lumpinee Stadium || Bangkok, Thailand || TKO || 4 || 
|-
! style=background:white colspan=9 |
|-  style="background:#FFBBBB;"
| 2019-12-17 || Loss ||align=left| Wanchalerm Uddonmuang || Lumpinee Stadium || Bangkok, Thailand || KO || 1 ||
|-
! style=background:white colspan=9 |
|-  style="background:#CCFFCC;"
| 2019-11-22 || Win ||align=left| Johnny FA Group || IKC K9 Championship, Lumpinee Stadium || Bangkok, Thailand || Decision || 5 || 3:00  
|-
! style=background:white colspan=9 |
|-  style="background:#FFBBBB;"
| 2019-08-24 || Loss ||align=left| Nayanesh Ayman || THAI FIGHT Kham Chanod || Udon Thani, Thailand || KO || 3 ||
|-  style="background:#CCFFCC;"
| 2019-07-14 || Win ||align=left| Keivan Soleimani || Super Champ Muay Thai || Bangkok, Thailand || Decision || 3 || 3:00
|-  style="background:#FFBBBB;"
| 2019-06-01 || Loss ||align=left| Capitan Petchyindee Academy || Lumpinee Stadium || Bangkok, Thailand || Decision || 5 || 3:00
|-
! style=background:white colspan=9 |
|-  style="background:#CCFFCC;"
| 2019-02-23 || Win||align=left| Salimkhan Ibragimov || Topking World Series TK28 || Surat Thani, Thailand || TKO || 3 ||
|-  style="background:#fbb;"
| 2018-02-10 || Loss||align=left| Han Feilong || Topking - EM Legend 30 || China || KO (Left Hook)|| 3 || 1:05
|-  style="background:#CCFFCC;"
| 2017-12-02 || Win ||align=left| Han Feilong || EM Legend 26 || China || Decision || 3 || 3:00
|-  style="background:#cfc;"
| 2017-09-01 || Win||align=left| Sorgraw Petchyindee || Rangsit Boxing Stadium || Thailand || Decision || 5 || 3:00
|-  style="background:#cfc;"
| 2017-05-19 || Win||align=left| Magnus Andersson || MX MUAY XTREME || Bangkok, Thailand || KO || 1 ||
|-  style="background:#CCFFCC;"
| 2017-03-17 || Win ||align=left| Captain Petchyindee || Miracle Muay Thai Festival || Bangkok, Thailand || Decision || 5 || 3:00
|-  style="background:#fbb;"
| 2017-02-24 || Loss||align=left| Sorgraw Petchyindee || Rangsit Boxing Stadium || Thailand || Decision || 5 || 3:00
|-  style="background:#fbb;"
| 2017-01-27 || Loss ||align=left| Rafael Fiziev || Toyota Marathon, Semi Final || Phitsanulok, Thailand || Decision || 3 || 3:00
|-  style="background:#CCFFCC;"
| 2016-11-26 || Win ||align=left| Expedito Valin || Millenium World Muaythai || Réunion, France || Decision || 5 || 3:00
|-
! style=background:white colspan=9 |
|-  style="background:#FFBBBB;"
| 2016-07-27 || Loss||align=left| Captain Petchyindee || Prince's Birthday || Bangkok, Thailand || Decision || 5 || 3:00 
|-
! style=background:white colspan=9 |
|-  style="background:#FFBBBB;"
| 2016-06-24 || Loss||align=left| Chamuaktong Fightermuaythai || Toyota Marathon, Final || Bangkok, Thailand || Decision || 3 || 3:00
|-  style="background:#CCFFCC;"
| 2016-06-24 || Win ||align=left| Manaowan Sitsongpeenong || Toyota Marathon, Semi Final || Bangkok, Thailand || KO || 1 ||
|-  style="background:#CCFFCC;"
| 2016-06-24 || Win ||align=left| Diesellek Petjinda || Toyota Marathon, Quarter Final ||  Bangkok, Thailand || Decision || 3 || 3:00
|-  style="background:#CCFFCC;"
| 2015-12-28 || Win ||align=left| Abdolhossein Abbasi Sibak || Topking World Series TK8 || Pattaya, Thailand || KO || 2 ||
|-  style="background:#CCFFCC;"
| 2015-10-03 || Win ||align=left| Henri Van Opstal || Xtreme Muay Thai 2015 || Macau || Decision || 3 || 3:00
|-  style="background:#FFBBBB;"
| 2015-09-20 || Loss||align=left| Dmitry Varats || Topking World Series TK6 || Vientiane, Laos || Decision || 3 || 3:00

|-  style="background:#CCFFCC;"
| 2015-08-11 || Win ||align=left| Tobias Kaewsamrit || Queen's Birthday Event, Rajamangala Stadium || Bangkok, Thailand || Decision || 5 || 3:00
|-
! style=background:white colspan=9 |
|-  style="background:#CCFFCC;"
| 2015-05-15 || Win ||align=left| Jaroenchai JpowerRoofSamui || ||  Phuket, Thailand || KO || 2 ||
|-  style="background:#FFBBBB;"
| 2015-02-28 || Loss||align=left| Rungrawee P.K. Saenchai Muaythai Gym || Omnoi Stadium ||  Bangkok, Thailand || Decision || 5 || 3:00
|-  style="background:#CCFFCC;"
| 2015-01-10 || Win ||align=left| Teeded Sitjakong || Omnoi Stadium ||  Bangkok, Thailand || KO || 3 ||
|-  style="background:#CCFFCC;"
| 2014-10-04 || Win ||align=left| Kongnakornbarn Sor.Kitrungroj || Omnoi Stadium ||  Bangkok, Thailand || Decision || 5 || 3:00
|-  style="background:#CCFFCC;"
| 2014-10-04 || Win ||align=left| Changpuek MuaythaiAcademy || Omnoi Stadium ||  Bangkok, Thailand || Decision || 5 || 3:00
|-  style="background:#c5d2ea;"
| 2014-08-30 || Draw ||align=left| Yodpayak Sitsongpeenong || Omnoi Stadium ||  Bangkok, Thailand || Decision || 5 || 3:00
|-  style="background:#CCFFCC;"
| 2014-08-23 || Win ||align=left| Rungrawee P.K. Saenchai Muaythai Gym || Omnoi Stadium || Bangkok, Thailand ||  Decision  || 5 || 3:00
|-  style="background:#CCFFCC;"
| 2014-03-17 || Win ||align=left| Singmanee Kaewsamrit || Miracle Muay Thai ||  Ayutthaya, Thailand || Decision  || 3 || 3:00
|-
! style=background:white colspan=9 |
|-  style="background:#CCFFCC;"
| 2014-01-11 || Win ||align=left| Petchasawin Seatransferry || Omnoi Stadium ||  Bangkok, Thailand || Decision || 5 || 3:00
|-  style="background:#FFBBBB;"
| 2013-11-23 || Loss ||align=left| Sitthichai Sitsongpeenong || Muay Dee Vithee Thai ||  Bangkok, Thailand || TKO || 1 ||
|-
! style=background:white colspan=9 |
|-  style="background:#CCFFCC;"
| 2013-10-26 || Win ||align=left| Mike 3000 || Real Hero Muay Thai ||  Sydney, Australia || Decision || 3 || 3:00
|-  style="background:#FFBBBB;"
| 2013-03-29 || Loss ||align=left| Sitthichai Sitsongpeenong || Toyota Marathon ||  Kanchanaburi, Thailand || Decision || 3 || 3:00
|-  style="background:#CCFFCC;"
| 2013-03-29 || Win ||align=left| Yodpayak Sitsongpeenong || Toyota Marathon || Kanchanaburi, Thailand || Decision || 5 || 3:00
|-  style="background:#CCFFCC;"
| 2013-03-29 || Win ||align=left| Sirimongkol Sitanupap || Toyota Marathon ||  Kanchanaburi, Thailand || Decision || 5 || 3:00
|-  style="background:#CCFFCC;"
| 2012-12-15 || Win||align=left| Dmitri Ushkanov || Muaythai World Fighter Spirit ||  Bangkok, Thailand || TKO || 2 ||
|-  style="background:#CCFFCC;"
| 2012-11-22 || Win ||align=left| Hichem Chaibi || Best of Siam 2 ||  Paris, France || Decision || 5 || 3:00
|-  style="background:#FFBBBB;"
| 2011-03-11 || Loss ||align=left| Chok Eminentair || Lumpinee Stadium ||  Bangkok, Thailand || Decision || 5 || 3:00
|-
| colspan=9 | Legend:

Lethwei record 

|-  bgcolor="#FFBBBB"
| 2019-04-14 || Loss ||align=left| Too Too || Thingyan Fight Chitthu Myaing Park || Hpa An, Myanmar || KO || 1 ||
|-  style="background:#CCFFCC;"
| 2019-01-09 || Win ||align=left| Phyan Thway || (27th) Karen New Year Celebration, Taung Ka Lay ||  Hpa-an, Myanmar || TKO (injury) || 3 || 
|-
|-
| colspan=9 | Legend:

References 

Detrit Sathian Gym
Detrit Sathian Gym
Middleweight kickboxers
Welterweight kickboxers
Living people
1990 births
Detrit Sathian Gym